Vricon was an American geospatial-intelligence data and software provider. It was a joint venture between Saab and DigitalGlobe and is headquartered in McLean, Virginia. 

Vricon's  3D geodata and 3D visualization uses stereophotogrammetry for visualization. Its system used hundreds of images, typically from commercial satellite imagery.  

Vricon used automated 3D image-processing algorithms to produce its high-resolution 3D data and solutions for government and commercial clients.

In early 2017, USG clients account for slightly less than 50 percent of total Vricon revenue.

On July 1, 2020, Vricon was acquired by Maxar Technologies for approximately $140 million USD.

References

American companies established in 2015
Geographic data and information companies